Telipna semirufa, the western telipna, is a butterfly in the family Lycaenidae. It is found in Guinea, Sierra Leone, Liberia, Ivory Coast, Ghana and Togo.

Subspecies
Telipna semirufa semirufa (Ivory Coast, Ghana, Togo)
Telipna semirufa ivoiriensis Libert, 2005 (Guinea, Sierra Leone, Liberia, Ivory Coast)

References

Butterflies described in 1889
Poritiinae
Butterflies of Africa
Taxa named by Henley Grose-Smith
Taxa named by William Forsell Kirby